Duits is a Dutch-language surname meaning "German".
People with the name include:

Charles Duits (1925–1991), French writer of the fantastique
Sander Duits (1983), Dutch former professional footballer
Thimo te Duits (1962), Dutch art historian, curator, author and editor

Surnames of Belgian origin
Dutch-language surnames
Ethnonymic surnames